Last Drinks is a 2000 Ned Kelly Award-winning novel by the Australian author Andrew McGahan.

A stage version premiered at Brisbane's La Boite Theatre in August 2006.

Awards
Ned Kelly Awards for Crime Writing, Best First Novel, 2001: winner

Reviews
 "Aussiereviews" Book Review: Last Drinks, by Andrew McGahan
 "The Australian Public Intellectual network" Australian Public Intellectual [API Network]

References

Australian crime novels
2000 Australian novels
Ned Kelly Award-winning works
Novels set in Brisbane